The 2023 Cazoo UK Open was a  darts tournament staged by the Professional Darts Corporation. It was the twenty-first year of the tournament where players compete in a single-elimination tournament to be crowned champion. The tournament was held at Butlin's Minehead, England, between 3–5 March 2023.

Danny Noppert was the defending champion after defeating Michael Smith 11–10 in the 2022 final to win his first major title, but he lost to William O'Connor 10–9 in the fifth round.

Andrew Gilding won his first major TV and first PDC ranking title at all, beating Michael van Gerwen 11–10 in a last leg decider when van Gerwen missed a dart at double 16 to win the match and the title.

Prize money
The prize fund was increased from £450,000 to £600,000.

The tournament will now also pay down to the last 128 for the first time, with second-round losers to receive £1,000.

Format
The 158 participants will enter the competition incrementally, with 62 players entering in the first round, with match winners joining the 32 players entering in the second and third rounds to leave the last 64 in the fourth round.

 No players are seeded.
 A random draw is held for each of the following rounds following the conclusion of the third round.
 All matches in the first, second and third rounds will be played over best of 11 legs.
 All matches in the fourth, fifth and sixth rounds and quarter-finals will be played over best of 19 legs.
 All matches in the semi-finals and final will be played over best of 21 legs.
 Eight boards will be used for matches in the first, second, third and fourth rounds.
 Four boards will be used for matches in the fifth round.
 Two boards will be used for matches in the sixth round.
 One board will be used for all the matches in the quarter-finals, semi-finals and final.

Qualifiers
The 128 Tour Card holders will have a staggered entry based on their world ranking on 27 February 2023. They will be joined by the top eight non-qualified players from each of the 2022 Challenge & Development Tour Orders of Merit, and by the winners of 16 Amateur Qualification events organised through Riley's Sports Bars.

The field was confirmed on 27 February, with both Corey Cadby and Christian Perez not participating, meaning there were two byes to the second round. Also, Challenge Tour qualifier David Pallett turned down his invite, so Lukas Wenig, who was next on the list, will take his place.

Number 1–32 on the PDC Order of Merit (receiving byes into fourth round)

Number 33–64 on the PDC Order of Merit (receiving byes into third round)

Number 65–96 on the PDC Order of Merit (receiving byes into second round)

Number 97–128 on the PDC Order of Merit (starting in first round)

PDC Development Tour qualifiers (starting in first round)
The top 8 ranked players from the 2022 Development Tour Order of Merit who didn't have a Tour Card for the 2023 season qualified for the first round.

PDC Challenge Tour qualifiers (starting in first round)
The top 8 ranked players from the 2022 Challenge Tour Order of Merit who didn't have a Tour Card for the 2023 season qualified for the first round.

Amateur qualifiers (starting in first round)
The winners of qualifiers organised by Rileys Sports Bars, held through January and February 2023, qualified for the first round. Entry to these tournaments was open to all players who had not qualified via another method, regardless of PDC Membership status.

Draw

Friday 3 March

First round (best of eleven legs)

Second round (best of eleven legs)

Third round (best of eleven legs)

Fourth round (best of nineteen legs)

Saturday 4 March

Fifth round (best of nineteen legs)

Sixth round (best of nineteen legs)

Sunday 5 March

Quarter-finals (best of nineteen legs)

Semi-finals and Final

References

UK Open
UK Open
UK Open
UK Open